Daniel Bambang Dwi Byantoro (born in Java, 1956) is an Indonesian archimandrite as well as founder of the Indonesian Orthodox Church. He served in Most Holy Trinity Parish, Banjarsari, Surakarta and Sts. Peter & Paul Parish in Jalan Lengkong Raya, Serpong, South Tangerang, Banten.

Early life  

Byantoro was born to a middle-class family in Indonesia. He was brought up by his maternal grandfather. He studied the Koran, and received Islamic teaching. According to his claim, he was converted to Charismatic Christianity, when Christ appeared to him during his evening Islamic prayers.

In 1978, he studied in Protestant Theological Seminary, the Asian Center for Theological Studies and Mission, (ACTS) in Seoul, South Korea. In 1982,  he  found The Orthodox Church by Kallistos Ware in a bookshop in Seoul, who introduced the Eastern Orthodox Church to him. On September 6, 1983, he converted to the Orthodox Church with the blessing of Ecumenical Patriarch of Constantinople, Patriarch Demetrios and Metropolitan Bishop Dionysius of New Zealand and crismated by Archimandrite Sotirios Trambas (Zelon Bishop, serving in Korea).

He completed his education in Korea, then travelled to Greece and the United States before returning to Indonesia.

Ministry 
On June 8, 1988, Byantoro began ministry in Indonesia. The first person who he converted to Orthodox Church was an ex-Muslim man named Muhammed Sugi Bassari, baptized as Photios, in April 1989.

Thought 

Theologically speaking, Archimandrite Daniel Byantoro has used the existing thought patterns of Indonesian culture to package Orthodox teaching within the Indonesian mental set up. Just as the Church Fathers had to face Greek paganism, Judaism, and Gnosticism in order to present the Gospel intelligibly to ancient peoples, Orthodox theology faces similar challenges in the context of the Indonesian mission. Those challenges are the Islamic strand that has similarities with Judaism, the Hindu-Buddhistic strand that has similarities with Greek paganism, the Javanese-mystical strand called "Kebatinan" (the "Esoteric Belief") that has similarities to Gnosticism. (It is a blend of ancient shamanistic-animism on the one hand and Hindu-Buddhistic mysticism and Islamic Sufism on the other, and is divided into many mystical denominations and groups, just like Gnosticism was.), and the secularistic-materialistic strand of the modern world.

Defrocking 
Having never been canonically released from the Orthodox Metropolitanate of Hong Kong and Southeast Asia, at present Fr. Daniel is officially regarded as being defrocked by OMHKSEA 

In 2019, he and some of the clergy left ROCOR and joined the Church of the Genuine Orthodox Christians of Greece.

References 

Eastern Orthodox Christians from Indonesia
1956 births
Living people
Indonesian people of Chinese descent
Indonesian former Muslims
Former Protestants
Converts to Eastern Orthodoxy from Protestantism
Converts to Protestantism from Islam